Eightcubed is a Canadian electronic music producer, DJ, and performer from Toronto, Ontario.  His debut album, Simple Dance, was released in 2006 by Abstract Core Records.  In 2008, "Heart Invaders"   was released with a music video directed by computer animator Dan Swan and nationally aired on MuchMusic throughout 2008 to 2011.  In 2009, he released City Life, an EP that received popular acclaim for its low-fi and retro- futuristic sound, heard in songs such as "Promise Me"  and "The Island of Purple Waterfall".  Another music video for the single "Enter Light" followed in 2011 with video animation by Andrea Simone.  In a Detroit radio interview, Eightcubed explained the importance of the storytelling found in his music.  In 2013, he released Sheath & Beyond EP, with the hit single "Comfort Temple", launching him into the Top 10 of many North American radio stations.  He has been featured in Now Magazine, RCRD LBL, MTV Canada, and independent blogs.

Musical style
Eightcubed's musical style has been described as "fantastical, mesmerizing, strangely addictive, innovative, retro-futuristic and whimsical".  In early 2007, Cue Mix Magazine proclaimed that his sound was "fascinating and groundbreaking". Eightcubed has stated that he leaves his musical writing to be defined by critics and that his most ardent instrument is the computer.

Discography

Albums

Singles

Remixes
Björk "Aurora" (2010)
The Pixies "Wave of Mutilation" (2010)
Lady Gaga "Bad Romance" (2010)
The Ramones "Blitzkrig Bop" (2011)
Madonna "Another Suitcase" (2011)
Dragonette "Let it Go" (2012)

Videography
"Heart Invaders" (2008) (directed by Dan Swan)
"Enter Light" (2011) (animation by Andrea Simone)

References
Citations

External links

Living people
Musicians from Toronto
Canadian electronic musicians
Musical groups from Toronto
Musical groups established in 2005
2005 establishments in Ontario
Year of birth missing (living people)